Mayra Nohemi Flores (born January 1, 1986) is an American politician who represented  in the United States House of Representatives from 2022 to 2023. A member of the Republican Party, she is the first female Mexican-born member of the House.

Flores was born in Burgos, Tamaulipas, Mexico; her family moved to the United States when she was six years old before she gained citizenship at age 14. She graduated from San Benito High School and South Texas College. Before her congressional campaign, she worked as a respiratory therapist and as chair of Hispanic outreach for the Hidalgo County Republican Party. In June 2022, a special election in Texas's 34th congressional district was held after Democratic Representative Filemon Vela Jr. resigned. Flores won the election, defeating three other candidates.

Flores lost her campaign for a full term in the November 2022 midterm elections to Democrat Vicente Gonzalez in the district that was redrawn that year.

Early life and education
Mayra Nohemi Flores was born on January 1, 1986, in Burgos, Tamaulipas, Mexico, to migrant farmworkers. Her family moved to the U.S. when she was six years old and she gained citizenship at 14. She graduated from San Benito High School in 2004. Her family often moved yearly throughout Texas during her childhood because of her and her parents' work picking cotton, which began in Memphis, Texas, when she was 13. She graduated from South Texas College in 2019.

Early political career
Flores's parents supported the Democratic Party, but she was drawn to the Republican Party due to her anti-abortion views. She has said that she was previously a Democrat, but left the party shortly after voting for Barack Obama in the 2008 presidential election.

Before her congressional campaigns and shortly after graduating from college, Flores worked in the Hidalgo County Republican Party as chair of Hispanic outreach. In 2022, she organized pro-Trump caravans through the Rio Grande Valley. Before her election to Congress, Flores used hashtags associated with the QAnon conspiracy theory on an Instagram post, though she has denied ever being a supporter of QAnon. In tweets that she later deleted, Flores also promoted the false claim that the 2021 United States Capitol attack was "set up" by antifa members among the crowd during the riot.

U.S. House of Representatives

Elections

2022 special

Flores declared her candidacy for the United States House of Representatives in  after incumbent Democratic representative Filemon Vela Jr. announced in March 2021 that he would not seek reelection in 2022. She ran her campaign appealing to Hispanic and Latino Americans and their disillusionment with the Democratic Party, which they have historically supported in South Texas. Following the establishment of new congressional districts as a part of the 2020 redistricting cycle, incumbent Democrat Vicente Gonzalez of the  announced his candidacy for the new 34th district. On March 1, 2022, Flores and Gonzalez won their respective partisan primaries and faced each other in the general election on November 8, 2022.

In March 2022, Vela announced his early resignation from Congress. Shortly after his announcement, Flores declared her candidacy in the special election on June 14, 2022, to fill the vacancy. Gonzalez did not run in the special election. Flores's campaign focused on her family, the economy, border security, and her upbringing as the daughter of immigrants. During the special election, Flores reported $752,000 in contributions, while Democrat Dan Sanchez of Harlingen reported $46,000. Flores defeated Sanchez with 50.91% of the vote to Sanchez's 43.37%, avoiding a runoff. She is the first Mexican-born woman elected to serve in Congress.

2022 general

In her general election campaign against Democrat Vincente Gonzalez, Flores has been targeted with racist and sexist comments; a blogger paid by the Gonzalez campaign called her "Miss Frijoles", "Miss Enchiladas", and a "cotton-pickin' liar". Gonzalez and district Democrats condemned these comments. Gonzalez has also called Flores "unqualified" and has claimed she cannot "think or speak for herself", criticisms that have been called sexist.
In the November 8 general election, Gonzalez defeated Flores to become the next Representative for the 34th District.

Tenure

Flores was sworn in by Speaker of the House Nancy Pelosi on June 21, 2022. Three days later, Flores spoke out about the Supreme Court opinion in Dobbs v. Jackson Women's Health Organization which overturned Roe v. Wade, calling the decision a "big win" and a "dream come true".

In June 2022, Flores voted against the Bipartisan Safer Communities Act.

In July 2022, The New York Times published an article about Flores's election, calling her a "far-right Latina". Flores responded to the article, saying The New York Times knew "nothing about me or our culture" and that "I have received only hate from the liberal media". The article was also criticized by Ted Cruz and Laura Ingraham, among others.

On July 19, 2022, Flores voted against the Respect for Marriage Act.

Political positions
Flores supports religious freedom, school choice, and abortion bans. She opposes same-sex marriage.
She backed former President Trump publicly and raised unfounded doubts about the results of the 2020 election.

Committee assignments
Flores' committee assignments included:

Committee on Homeland Security
Subcommittee on Border Security, Facilitation, & Operations
Subcommittee on Transportation & Maritime Security
Committee on Agriculture

Personal life
Flores has worked as a respiratory therapist. She is married to John Vallejo, a U.S. Border Patrol agent, with whom she has four children.

Electoral history

See also
List of Hispanic and Latino Americans in the United States Congress
Women in the United States House of Representatives

References

External links 
 
 

|-

1986 births
21st-century American politicians
21st-century American women politicians
American politicians of Mexican descent
American Roman Catholics
Christians from Texas
Female members of the United States House of Representatives
Hispanic and Latino American members of the United States Congress
Hispanic and Latino American women in politics
Latino conservatism in the United States
Living people
Mexican emigrants to the United States
Naturalized citizens of the United States
People from Hidalgo County, Texas
Politicians from Tamaulipas
Republican Party members of the United States House of Representatives from Texas
Women in Texas politics